Kmetija 2021 (The Farm 2021) is the tenth season of the Slovene reality television series Kmetija. After a year of hiatus due to the COVID-19 pandemic, the show returns with 16 contestants competing against each other to win €50,000. Presented by Natalija Bratkovič, the contestants live on a Farm like it was a century ago, completing tasks for the Farm Mentor, Nada Zorec, who'll judge & determine whether the contestants get a weekly prize or not. Each week the Head of the Farm chooses two butlers where the rest of the contestants later decide who the first duelist is. The duelist selects who they face against to compete in the duel. Whoever loses the duel is eliminated from the game but before they go, they write a letter stating who they have decided the Head of the Farm will be for the upcoming week. The season premiered on 6 September 2021 on Pop TV.

Contestants
Among the contestants is 2015 finalist Franc Vozel.

The game

Notes

References

External links

The Farm (franchise)
2020s Slovenian television series